Shun Li and the Poet is a 2011 Italian drama film directed by Andrea Segre. It won the European Parliament Lux Prize in 2012. Zhao Tao won the 2012 David di Donatello for Best Actress for her performance as Shun Li. It also took out the 2014 Whitehead Award at the 13th annual international film festival.

Plot 
Shun Li (Zhao Tao) has been working in a textile workshop in the outskirts of Rome for eight years to pay off her debt to the human traffickers in order to bring her son to Italy. She is suddenly transferred to Chioggia, a small island town situated in the Venetian lagoon, to work as a bartender. Bepi (Rade Šerbedžija), a fisherman of Slavic origin, nicknamed "the Poet", has been visiting the bar for years. Their meeting is a poetic escape from loneliness, a laconic dialogue between different cultures. It is a journey into the heart of a deep lagoon, known to be a mother and birthplace of identity. But the friendship between Shun Li and Bepi disturbs both communities, Chinese and Chioggia, which hinders this new journey, which perhaps is simply still too scary. They part ways but, like the ocean, are drawn back together again.

Cast 
Zhao Tao: Shun Li
Rade Šerbedžija: Bepi
Marco Paolini: Coppe
Roberto Citran: Avvocato
Giuseppe Battiston: Devis

See also 
 Movies about immigration to Italy

References

External links 

 
 
 

2011 films
Italian drama films
2010s Italian-language films
2011 drama films
Films about immigration
Films set in Rome
Films shot in Venice
Films shot in Rome
2010s Italian films